Khoy and Chaypareh is the 3rd electoral district in the West Azerbaijan Province of Iran. It has a population of 397,515 and elects 1 member of parliament.

1980
MP in 1980 from the electorate of Khoy. (1st)
 Kamel Abedinzadeh

1984
MP in 1984 from the electorate of Khoy. (2nd)
 Hashem Hejazifar

1988
MP in 1988 from the electorate of Khoy. (3rd)
 Hashem Hejazifar

1992
MP in 1992 from the electorate of Khoy. (4th)
 Kamel Abedinzadeh

1996
MP in 1996 from the electorate of Khoy. (5th)
 Kamel Abedinzadeh

2000
MP in 2000 from the electorate of Khoy and Chaypareh. (6th)
 Ali Taghizadeh

2004
MP in 2004 from the electorate of Khoy and Chaypareh. (7th)
 Hashem Hejazifar

2008
MP in 2008 from the electorate of Khoy and Chaypareh. (8th)
 Movayyed Hoseini Sadr

2012
MP in 2012 from the electorate of Khoy and Chaypareh. (9th)
 Movayyed Hoseini Sadr

2016

Notes

References

Electoral districts of West Azerbaijan
Khoy County
Chaypareh County
Deputies of Khoy and Chaypareh